The Arizona–New Mexico football rivalry is an American college football rivalry between the Arizona Wildcats and New Mexico Lobos. They have met 67 times on the football field. Arizona leads the series 44–20–3.

Kit Carson Rifle
From 1938 to 1990, the winner of the rivalry took ownership of the Kit Carson Rifle. The gun is a Springfield Model 1866 rifle that is rumored to have once belonged to the famous frontier scout, Kit Carson. Game scores from each game are carved into the stock of the rifle. Prior to the 1997 Insight.com Bowl, the two schools announced that they would retire the rifle due to concerns of its history of violence against Native Americans and it has not been used during any subsequent games between the two schools.

Game results

 Non-conference games (34: 1908–1930, 1951–1961 and 1978–2015)
 Two bowl games: 1997 and 2015
 Not played in 46 seasons (1914–1919, 1943–1945, 1978–1986, 1988–1989, 1991–1996, 1998–2006, 2009–2014 and 2016–2021)

Coaching records

Since first game on November 26, 1908

Arizona

New Mexico

See also
 List of NCAA college football rivalry games

References

Arizona Wildcats football
College football rivalries in the United States
New Mexico Lobos football